Joseph Burns (c. 1806 – 17 June 1848) was a New Zealand murderer, born in Liverpool, England. He was the first European in New Zealand to be executed for a capital crime. He was hanged on 17 June 1848 in Auckland.

References

1806 births
1848 deaths
English emigrants to New Zealand
New Zealand people convicted of murder
People convicted of murder by New Zealand